Saansein is a 2016 Indian Hindi-language romantic horror film directed by Rajiv S Ruia and produced by Goutam Kumar Jain. It stars Rajneesh Duggal, Sonarika Bhadoria, Hiten Tejwani, and Neetha Shetty. The film was released on 25 November 2016.

Plot
Shirin (Sonarika Bhadoria) is a singer at one of the best clubs in Mauritius. Her beauty invariably gets a lot of visitors interested in her. However Shirin never meets anyone and rather mysteriously disappears every night as soon as her performance is over. Even being close to her is horrifying.
 
That's when the hero Abhay (Rajneesh Duggal) enters the story. Having come to Mauritius for business purposes, he happens to land up at the same club and falls for Shirin right away. Shirin ignores Abhay, but he refuses to give up. He makes up his mind to find what is actually keeping her away. And that's when he stumbles upon a secret that Shirin has. Abhay is not deterred. He swears to find a way for them to be together come what may.

Cast 
 Rajneesh Duggal as Abhay
 Sonarika Bhadoria as Shirin
 Hiten Tejwani as C.K. Bir
 Neetha Shetty as Tanya
 Sachi Ruia as Aditi
 Aamir Dalvi as Shubrat
 Vishal Malhotra as Deewan
 Aman Prajapat as Ronnie

Soundtrack

References

External links
 

Indian romantic horror films
2010s Hindi-language films
Films shot in Mauritius
Films set in Mauritius